Tongling Yangtze River Bridge is a cable-stayed bridge near Tongling, Anhui, China. The bridge spans  over the Yangtze River. The bridge  carries four lanes of the G3 Beijing–Taipei Expressway.

See also
List of largest cable-stayed bridges
Yangtze River bridges and tunnels

References

Bridges in Anhui
Bridges completed in 1995
Cable-stayed bridges in China
Bridges over the Yangtze River